State Express Transport Corporation (Tamil Nadu) Ltd - (SETC) is a state-owned transport corporation that runs long-distance mofussil services exceeding 300 km and above throughout the state of Tamil Nadu and major cities in adjoining states of Andhra Pradesh, Karnataka, Kerala and the union territory of Puducherry.

History
A separate entity exclusively for operating long-distance express services was conceived by the Government of Tamil Nadu in 1975, and the services were transferred to the newly formed express wing of Pallavan Transport Corporation with effect from 15 September 1975. It was registered formally on 14 January 1980 and renamed as Thiruvalluvar Transport Corporation (TTC) in honor of the Tamil poet Thiruvalluvar. During the 1990s, JJTC was formed, which operated interstate routes of the erstwhile TTC. JJTC was then renamed as RGTC in 1996. Both TTC and RGTC were later merged into the State Express Transport Corporation (SETC) in 1997.

Depot

Types of services 
SETC provides services at fixed rates throughout the year, unlike Omni buses where fares increase multi-fold during long weekends and festival holidays. A multi-fare system is followed on certain types of services. 

SETC offers the following types of services:

Services 
 Ultra Deluxe: It is a non-AC bus service with 2+2 reclining seater seats built on single-axle Ashok Leyland chassis with a white livery.
 Classic: It is a non-AC bus service with 2+2 reclining seater seats and a toilet facility built on single-axle Ashok Leyland chassis with a white livery.
 Non-AC Sleeper: It is a non-AC bus service with 2+1 lower and upper berth sleeper seats built on single-axle Ashok Leyland chassis with a white livery.
 Non-AC Sleeper Cum Seater: It is a non-AC bus service with 2+1 reclining seater seats and 2+1 upper berth sleeper seats built on single-axle Ashok Leyland chassis with a white livery.
 AC Seater: It is an AC bus service with 2+2 reclining seater seats built on single-axle Ashok Leyland chassis with a white livery.
 AC Sleeper: It is an AC bus service with 2+1 lower and upper berth sleeper seats built on single-axle Ashok Leyland chassis with a white livery.
 AC Seater cum Sleeper: It is an AC bus service with 2+1 reclining seater seats and 2+1 upper berth sleeper seats built on single-axle Ashok Leyland chassis with a white livery.

Reservations
SETC provides advance booking and reservations on all of its routes. The advance reservation period is 60 days before the journey date. There are options to reserve tickets online as well as in SETC counters at major locations. The travellers will be notified by SMS with a conductor's mobile number when the passenger list is printed at the originating station.

References

External links
 SETC Tamil Nadu

Bus companies of India
Transport in Tamil Nadu
Companies based in Chennai
State road transport corporations of India
Government agencies established in 1997
Government-owned companies of India
1997 establishments in Tamil Nadu
Indian companies established in 1997